Holy Transfiguration Church, also known as Church of Gjirokastër is an Orthodox church in Gjirokastër, Albania. The church was built in 1784. It is a Cultural Monument of Albania since 1963.

References

Churches in Gjirokastër
Buildings and structures in Gjirokastër
Churches completed in 1784
Eastern Orthodox church buildings in Albania
18th-century Eastern Orthodox church buildings
18th-century churches in Albania